Clifton Webb (born 7 June 1978) is a New Zealand sailor. He competed in the Finn event at the 2000 Summer Olympics, and later became a sailing coach.

References

External links
 

1978 births
Living people
New Zealand male sailors (sport)
Olympic sailors of New Zealand
Sailors at the 2000 Summer Olympics – Finn
Sportspeople from Auckland
People from Takapuna